The Pocahontas Post Office is located at 109 Van Bibber Street in downtown Pocahontas, Arkansas.  It is a single-story square brick building with a flat roof highlighted by a concrete cornice.  It was built in 1936–37 with funding from the Works Progress Administration, and is a fine local example of restrained Art Deco architecture.  Its main lobby houses a mural funded by the Section of Fine Arts, drawn by H. Louis Freund, entitled Early Days of Pocahontas.

The building was listed on the National Register of Historic Places in 2002.

See also 

National Register of Historic Places listings in Randolph County, Arkansas
List of United States post offices

References

External links

Post office buildings on the National Register of Historic Places in Arkansas
Art Deco architecture in Arkansas
Government buildings completed in 1936
Buildings and structures in Randolph County, Arkansas
Individually listed contributing properties to historic districts on the National Register in Arkansas
National Register of Historic Places in Randolph County, Arkansas